Whitaker House can refer to:
 Whitaker House, a Christian publishing corporation in New Kensington, Pennsylvania

Or it may refer to:

Places
in the United States (by state then city)
William Whitaker Landscape and House, Crown Point, Indiana, listed on the National Register of Historic Places (NRHP) in Lake County
Charles Whitaker House (Davenport, Iowa), listed on the NRHP in Scott County
Charles Whitaker House (Georgetown, Kentucky), listed on the NRHP in Scott County
The Kingsbury-Whitaker House, a historic home in Needham, Massachusetts, listed on the NRHP in Norfolk County
The Whitaker-Clary House, a historic house in New Salem, Massachusetts, listed on the NRHP in Franklin County
Whitaker House (Benton, New York), listed on the NRHP in Yates County
The Rogers-Whitaker-Haywood House, a historic home in Wake Crossroads, North Carolina, listed on the NRHP in Wake County
Whitaker-Motlow House, Mulberry, Tennessee, listed on the NRHP in Lincoln County
Whitaker House (Texarkana, Texas), listed on the NRHP in Bowie County
Whitaker-McClendon House, Tyler, Texas, listed on the NRHP in Smith County
John M. Whitaker House, Salt Lake City, Utah, listed on the NRHP in Salt Lake City
Thomas and Elizabeth Mills Whitaker House, Centerville, Utah, listed on the NRHP in Davis County